The Niau kingfisher (Todiramphus gertrudae) is a species of bird in the family Alcedinidae.  It is endemic to the island of Niau in French Polynesia.  Its natural habitats are subtropical or tropical dry forests, plantations and rural gardens. Only 125 individuals remain in the wild.
The Niau kingfisher is a multicolored, with bright blue feathers, a dusty orange head, and a bright green back. The entire population of these birds lives in Niau, and without serious intervention, they will likely become extinct.

In new studies published in the journal The Auk (published by the American Ornithologists Union) and the Journal of Wildlife Management, Kesler and his team of researchers have uncovered important information to help ensure the birds' survival and a unique way to attach radio transmitters to the birds to track them."Unfortunately, even with all our work to date, the population is still crashing," Kesler said. "We're seeing some turnover, but each year when we return, there are more empty territories and the population decreases. At this rate, these birds will be gone within our lifetime."

The introduction of other competitive species (such as felis silvestres catus) into the kingfishers habitat led to their decrease in population because of competition for the same food sources. Removal of the new species would likely result in a recovery of the Kingfisher population, at least in the most populated areas. Clements has merged this bird with the Mangareva kingfisher.

References

Footnotes

Sources
Kesler, D. C., R. J. Laws, A. S. Cox, A. Gouni, and J. D. Stafford. 2012. "Survival, territory resources, and population persistence in the critically endangered Tuamotu Kingfisher." Journal of Wildlife Management 76:1001-1009.
Kesler, D. C. 2012. "Foraging habitat distributions affect territory size and shape in the Tuamotu Kingfisher." International Journal of Zoology Article ID 632969, 7 pages:1-7.
Kesler, D. C., A. S. Cox, G. Albar, A. Gouni, J. Mejeur, and C. Plasse. 2012. "Translocation of Tuamotu kingfishers, post-release exploratory behavior and harvest effects on the donor population." Pacific Science 66:467-480.
Coulombe, G. C., D. C. Kesler, and A. Gouni. 2011. "Factors influencing occurrence and habitat use of Tuamotu Kingfishers at landscape and territory scales." Auk 128:283-292.
Kesler, D. C. 2011. "Non-permanent radiotelemetry leg harness for small birds." Journal of Wildlife Management. 75:467-471.

Niau kingfisher
Birds of the Tuamotus
Niau kingfisher
Taxonomy articles created by Polbot
Taxobox binomials not recognized by IUCN